Bahman Shiraz Football Club is an Iranian football club based in Shiraz, Iran.They currently compete in the Azadegan League.

In 2015 for the first time in the club's history, Bahman was promoted to the Azadegan League.

Season-by-Season

The table below shows the achievements of the club in various competitions.

See also
 2014–15 Iran Football's 2nd Division

References

Football clubs in Iran
Association football clubs established in 1998
1998 establishments in Iran
2015 disestablishments in Iran